Götene Municipality (Götene kommun) is a  municipality in Västra Götaland County in western Sweden. Its seat is located in the town of Götene.

When the first Swedish local government acts went into force in 1863, 20 rural municipal entities (each corresponding to a parish of the Church of Sweden) were created in the area. The municipal reform of 1952 grouped them into three, new, larger units. These were amalgamated in 1967 to form the present municipality.

The two most notable sights in the municipality are the mountain/ridge Kinnekulle (with 306 meters the highest point in the county) and the village Husaby, with an old church and church well, where the first Christian king of Sweden, Olof Skötkonung, is believed to have been baptized.

Localities
Population figures from Statistics Sweden.
Götene (seat), 4,600
Källby, 1,500
Lundsbrunn, 900
Hällekis, 700

Sister cities
Götene has a sister city in Lithuania called Pasvalys which has about 7,500 inhabitants.

Tourism
Götene is part of the Läckö-Kinnekulle tourism area. To boast its geographical uniqueness, it uses a symbol of the Kinnekulle mountain mirroring in Lake Vänern.

References

External links

Götene Municipality - Official site
Läckö Kinnekulle Tourism - In Swedish, English and German

Municipalities of Västra Götaland County
Skaraborg